The 1888 AHAC season was the second season of the Amateur Hockey Association of Canada. Play was in a series format. The Montreal Hockey Club would win a playoff game against the Montreal Victorias 2-1 to win the Canadian championship for the first time.

League business 
The league at its annual meeting of November 9, 1887, decided to change the method of play for the season to a 'series' between the teams of the AHAC. Each team would play every other team twice. Ottawa did not attend and did not participate in the season.

Executive

 President: J. J. Arnton, Victorias
 1st Vice president: J. A. Stewart, Montreal
 2nd Vice president: H. A. Budden, McGill
 Secretary-treasurer: W. E. Stenvenson, Victorias
 Council: A. L. Shanks, McGill; D. A. Elliott, Crystals; A. Shearer, Victorias; L. Barlow, Montreal

Source: Kitchen 2000, p. 11

Regular season 

Ottawa would not return this season to challenge.

Overall record 

† National Champion

Playoff 
 March 15 - Montreal HC 2, Montreal Victorias 1, at Crystal Rink

The playing of the game was tarnished with some scandal. The AHAC council convened to set the date of the playoff. Two players for the Victorias, Ashe and J. J. Arnton Jr. were injured, and the council set the date for the playoff before the players were recovered. The deciding vote for the date was cast by J. Stewart, who played for the Montreal HC team. Hodgson of Montreal scored the first goal at 4½ minutes, followed two minutes by a goal of Campbell for the Vics. 5½ minutes later Hodgson lifted a shot past Arnton in the Vic's goal to put Montreal ahead to stay. The Vics protested that the goal was off-side to no avail. There was no more scoring in the match. The Montreal Daily Herald reporter praised referee Hamilton of the McGill Club, noting that both side broke the off-side rule often.

Schedule and results 

Source: "Before the Trail of the Stanley Cup"

Player statistics

Scoring leaders

Goaltender averages 
Note: GP = Games played, GA = Goals against, SO = Shutouts, GAA = Goals against average

Montreal HC 1888 AHAC champions 

Source: Kitchen 2000, p. 11

References

Bibliography

Notes

1888
AHAC